Nguyễn Vũ Hoàng Dương (born 20 August 1992) is a Vietnamese footballer who plays as a midfielder for V-League club Thanh Hóa.

References 

1992 births
Living people
Vietnamese footballers
Association football midfielders
V.League 1 players
Thanh Hóa FC players
Haiphong FC players